Lomatozona is a genus of Brazilian flowering plants in the tribe Eupatorieae within the family Asteraceae.

 Species
 Lomatozona andersonii R.M.King & H.Rob. - Goiás
 Lomatozona artemisiifolia Baker - Goiás
 Lomatozona huntii R.M.King & H.Rob. - Mato Grosso, Goiás
 Lomatozona inaequale R.M.King & H.Rob. - Mato Grosso, Goiás

References

Asteraceae genera
Endemic flora of Brazil
Eupatorieae
Taxa named by John Gilbert Baker